Stew Leonard's is a regional chain of seven supermarkets in Connecticut, New York, and New Jersey, which Ripley's Believe It or Not! deemed "The World's Largest Dairy" and Fortune magazine listed as one of the "100 Best Companies to Work For".

Opened in 1969 with seven employees in Norwalk, Connecticut, the chain now includes six stores in Connecticut and New York. The newest location opened on September 18, 2019 in Paramus, NJ.

History

Clover Farms Dairy 
Charles Leonard, a hatter in a sweatshop, founded Clover Farms Dairy in Norwalk, CT, in the early 1920s.

First store 
In 1969, Stew Leonard opened the Clover Farms Dairy store in Norwalk.

Expansion 
Stew Leonard acquired land for a second store in Danbury, CT, in the mid-1980s. The store opened in 1991.

Stew Leonard's announced plans to open a store in Yonkers, NY, in 1997. The store opened in September 1999.

The Leonard family began working to open a store on Long Island, in 2002. However, plans to open a store across from the Republic Airport in Farmingdale, NY fell through. In 2015, Stew Leonard's announced plans to open a store in Farmingdale in early 2016; the store opened in January 2016.

A store in Newington, Connecticut was announced in February 2006 and opened in April 2007.

Controversies

Tax fraud 
In 1993, Stew Leonard Sr. was convicted of having committed tax fraud via an elaborate scheme to divert more than $17.1 million in cash register receipts over a 10-year period. The fraud, which involved a computer program designed to skim off sales, was directed by Stew Leonard Sr., in concert with the company's CFO and store manager. Skimmed cash was placed in bundles in Leonard Sr.'s office fireplace, to be later moved offshore or disguised as gifts. Leonard Sr. was caught in June 1991 carrying $80,000 cash en route to the Caribbean island of Saint Martin.

Leonard Sr. pled guilty to the charges and, in 1993, was sentenced to 52 months in prison. He ultimately served 44 months before being released in June 1997.

Short-weighting
In 1993, shortly after Stew Leonard Sr. and three other company executives had pled guilty in the tax fraud case, the Connecticut Department of Consumer Protection charged Stew Leonard's with short-weighting customers on multiple products. The department measured a 47% violation rate, compared with a statewide average of 7.2%. Stew Leonard Jr. and Tom Leonard denied that these actions were intentional and claimed, "a larger percentage of products checked were, in fact, overweight than underweight", and, "we corrected every [mistake] before the inspector even left the store."

Hostile work environment

In June 2022, Robert Crosby Jr., who worked for Stew Leonard’s from 2001 to 2020, filed a lawsuit against the company and its CEO, Stew Leonard Jr., in which he alleges that the company operated a hostile work environment. Crosby alleges that Leonard referred to women, Jewish people, and Black people using derogatory terms. Crosby claimed that a company executive ordered him and his coworkers to bury tombstones found on land that the company leased for its Yonkers, New York store, with a threat of firing employees if anyone found out about them.

In his lawsuit, Crosby said that the company banned workers from wearing protective masks in March 2020, despite the declaration of the COVID-19 pandemic. Over 50 employees, including Crosby, contracted the SARS-CoV-2 virus in March and April. Crosby was hospitalized in September 2020 for complications from the virus. After the company refused to grant him medical leave, it fired him the same month. Crosby contends that this action violated the Americans with Disabilities Act.

Stores 

There are currently three stores in Connecticut:
 Norwalk, opened in 1969
 Danbury, opened in 1991
 Newington, opened in 2007
There are currently three stores in New York:
 Yonkers, opened in 1999
 Farmingdale, opened in 2016
 East Meadow, opened in 2017
There is currently one store in New Jersey:
 Paramus, opened in 2019

Features and layout 
The New York Times called Stew Leonard's the "Disneyland of Dairy Stores." The stores are not set up like traditional grocery stores; the aisle configurations guide customers to walk through the entire store (although there are short cuts). As customers walk through the aisles, they are greeted by various employees dressed up in costumes and by animatronic characters, called the "Farm Fresh Five", that perform songs and dance. Stew Leonard's famous "Stew Burger", the nickname given to the store's hamburger, is displayed by the entrance of each location. The stores also feature petting zoos and outdoor cafes in the warmer months, and offer tasting booths and a variety of prepared meals year round.

"Anyone who comes from Connecticut or thereabouts knows this landmark chain of grocery stores where mechanized cows sing and roosters crow," according to a writer for the Sun-Sentinel of Florida.

Corporate philosophy
The store is notable for its customer service policy, which greets shoppers at each store's entrance, etched into a three-ton rock:

1. The customer is always right.
2. If the customer is ever wrong, reread rule #1.

See also 
 Jungle Jim's International Market

References

Companies based in Norwalk, Connecticut
Companies based in Fairfield County, Connecticut
Retail companies established in 1969
Supermarkets of the United States
Animatronic attractions
1969 establishments in Connecticut